Bristol Township, Ohio, may refer to:

Bristol Township, Morgan County, Ohio
Bristol Township, Trumbull County, Ohio

Ohio township disambiguation pages